Gastropus is a genus of rotifers belonging to the family Gastropodidae. 

The species of this genus are found in Europe, Australia and Northern America.

Species:
 Gastropus hyptopus (Ehrenberg, 1838) 
 Gastropus minor (Rousselet, 1892)

References

Rotifer genera
Ploima